(TIW AG, originally , abbreviated ) was a brickworks making which existed in Wiesloch, Germany between 1895 and 1989.  It was one of the largest and most significant factories in Germany.
The factory was located just north of Wiesloch-Walldorf station and was the largest employer in Wiesloch.

Raw clay material was excavated from a clay pit in the  forest on the north-west side of Wiesloch.  This clay material was located at an elevation of 120 metres above sea level within the Upper Rhine Graben.

The factory contained one of many industrial 600 mm gauge railways in Germany.  Use of the narrow-gauge trains to fetch material from the clay pit finished in 1979.  Since 2001 the Wiesloch Feldbahn and Industrial Museum has been based at part of the north end of the site, and since 2016 the Leimbach Park has been built on the south end of the site, with the rest of the area transformed into an industrial zone.

Location
The brickworks was situated in a concentrated node of industry activity around Wiesloch-Walldorf station. In the vicinity were also the Kälberer sand mine, the Wiesloch power station, the Southern Germany Metal factory and oven manufacturer Welker and Wimmer.

Production
During the 1920s, the factory produced 12 million roof tiles per year. These basins covered 40% of the factory land, as compared to the factory buildings which covered 2.5% of the land.

Clay pit
In 1988 it was decided to maintain a minimum thickness of 2.5 metres of residual clay as a protection layer for the surrounding ground water. It was decided to not permit hazardous waste to be deposited. In 1992 the pit was re-opened as a landfill site accepting building materials, with 870,000 tonnes of material deposited between 1992 and 2017.

History
On 2 May 1896, Ludwig Schweizer from Bruchsal arranged a contract with the Town of Wiesloch for the extraction of clay.
Followed by, on 15 September 1896, an application was made for a private siding connection to the Grand Duchy of Baden State Railway at Wiesloch-Walldorf station.

Starting in 1906, a 2-kilometre narrow gauge railway started operating, using locomotive power.  The route of the narrow gauge railway was planned by the Town of Wiesloch.
Between 1 and 20 May 1907 the company took part in the International Art and Huge Horticultural Exhibition/Anniversary Exhibition of Mannheim 1907 which took place in the vicinity of the Mannheim Augustaanlage (de).

On 22 July 1916, a fire burnt down most of the factory.
In the time period leading up to 1918, production at the factory ceased for approximately three years, during which dividends could not be paid out.  At the Annual Meeting, 639 shares were represented and the company's balance and profit were reduced.

On 7 May 1920 an Extraordinary General Meeting was called to increase the capital in the company from 600,000 Marks to 2,350,000 Marks.

In the 1920s the firm allowed free use of their equipment for research by the Geology and Paleontology Institute of the University of Heidelberg.

From 1929 the company had a co-operation with the Carl Ludowici Ziegelwerke (de) at Jockgrim allowing the manufacture based on the Ludowici Ziegelwerke interlocking system.

On 22 March 1945, eighty-percent of the factory burnt down again.

On 21 July 1991 the fifty-metre-high chimney of the Tonwarenindustrie Wielsoch was demolished.

Buildings
Following closure of the factory and clearing of the site, a few buildings remained:

 TIW Canteen building.

Three further buildings were advertised for sale by the City of Wiesloch in May 2006.

Locomotives

The factory used a large number of narrow gauge locomotives, the first steam locomotive from Orenstein & Koppel arriving in 1905, and a second in 1921.  From the mid-1930s onwards these were replaced by diesel-powered narrow gauge locomotives.  When the narrow gauge system stopped operating there were seven locomotives.

See also 
 Diepholzer Maschinenfabrik Fritz Schöttler (Diema)

References

Further reading

External links
 
 RheinNeckar:Tonwarenindustrie Wiesloch (de)
 

Brickworks
Buildings and structures in Rhein-Neckar-Kreis
Companies based in Wiesloch